Vladimir III Mstislavich (1132–1171) was a prince of Dorogobuzh (1150–1154, 1170–1171), Volodymyr and Volyn (1154–1157), Slutsk (1162), Trypillia (1162–1168) and Grand Prince of Kiev (1171). He was the son of Mstislav I Vladimirovich, grandson of Vladimir Monomakh. Due to his brief rule, he is omitted from some lists of the princes of Kiev.

He was a son of Mstislav I from his second marriage with Liubava Dmitrievna Zavidich. According to Latopis kijowski Vladimir was born between 1 March 1131 and 29 February 1132.
 
He kept excellent ties with Hungary and Serbia. In 1150 he married the daughter of Serbia's Beloš Vukanović. According to old Russian annals, her titular name was inscribed as "Banovna".

External links
 Princes of Kyiv

1132 births
1171 deaths
Grand Princes of Kiev
Monomakhovichi family
12th-century princes in Kievan Rus'
Eastern Orthodox monarchs